Burluk is a rural locality (a selo) and the administrative center of Burlukskoye Rural Settlement, Kotovsky District, Volgograd Oblast, Russia. The population was 711 as of 2010. There are 12 streets.

Geography 
Burluk is located in steppe, on Volga Upland, on the right bank of the Burluk River, 52 km northwest of Kotovo (the district's administrative centre) by road. Gromki is the nearest rural locality.

References 

Rural localities in Kotovsky District
Kamyshinsky Uyezd